As You Were is a 1951 American service comedy film directed by Bernard Girard and Fred Guiol and starring William Tracy, Joe Sawyer and Russell Hicks. Released by the low-budget Lippert Pictures, it is considered a B movie. It was one of eight films featuring Tracy as Sergeant Dorian "Dodo" Doubleday, and features footage from the production team's previous 1941 film Tanks a Million.

Plot
An infusion of WAC beauties adds to the fun when ex-G.I. "Dodo" Doubleday (William Tracy), now a hotel clerk, impresses Army brass with his memory and considers going back into the military. But recruiting station sergeant Bill Ames (Joe Sawyer), remembering how Tracy jinxed him back in WWII days, begs him not to re-enlist.

Cast
 William Tracy as Sgt. Dorian 'Dodo' Doubleday  
 Joe Sawyer as Sgt. Ames  
 Russell Hicks as Col. Lockwood  
 John Ridgely as Captain  
 Sondra Rodgers as WAC Captain  
 Joan Vohs as Sgt. Peggy P. Hopper 
 Edgar Dearing as Sgt. Monahan  
 Chris Drake 
 Ruth Lee 
 Margie Liszt
 Roger McGee 
 John Parrish
 Maris Wrixon 
 Roland Morris as Soldier

Production
Robert L. Lippert intended to make a series of films with Hal Roach Jr.'s R and J Productions, including 12 films for television, and As You Were was their first collaboration. However, because of Lippert's difficulties with the Screen Actors Guild, only this film and Tales of Robin Hood were made.

The film was originally titled Present Arms.

References

Bibliography
 Clifford McCarty. Film Composers in America: A Filmography, 1911–1970. Oxford University Press, 2000.

External links
 

1951 films
1951 comedy films
American comedy films
Films directed by Bernard Girard
Lippert Pictures films
American black-and-white films
1950s English-language films
1950s American films